Aarhus RK is a Danish rugby club in Aarhus. They currently play in the DRU Superliga.

History
The club was founded in 1974.

In 2006 the club became Danish Rugby champions in the Danish Superleague and also the first official Danish champions in Danish rugby 7’s. They continued their XV men championship success in 2008, 2011 & 2012, and also in the Danish 7s championship in 2007, 08' & 12'.

Players

Current squad

Internationally Capped Players

External links
Aarhus RK

Danish rugby union teams
Sport in Aarhus
Rugby clubs established in 1974
1974 establishments in Denmark